Russian media football emerged at the end of the 2010s.

History 
In 2017, Russian YouTubers who make content based on the FIFA video game series united in the 7F United team. The squad included , PandaFx, Finito, German El Classico Popkov, Stavr, Den4ik Flomasteroff and Goodmax. They recorded football challenges, but the channel did not last long due to organizational difficulties.

In 2018, after the FIFA World Cup, Popkov decided to revive the idea of creating a media football club and invite "fifers" and football bloggers to the project under the temporary name German's Team. Football matches came to replace the challenges, and in August 2018 the team was named Amkal.

Among the participants were the teams of Match TV and Comedy Club Production. The team of the YouTube channel 2DROTS also participated in it.

In 2021, Popkov restarted his project. At the same time, the NaSporte club began to gain momentum in media football, which included such celebrities as Danya Milokhin, T-killah and football player Dmitry Tarasov.

In August 2022, Amkal and 2DROTS were invited to the 2022–23 Russian Cup.

In September 2022, approximately 40 players from media teams left Russia due to partial mobilization in the country.

Tournaments 
 
 Media Football League
 Liga Bloggers Cup

Reception 
Journalists note the popularity of media football. Ivan Kovalchuk from Eurosport wrote that "current schoolchildren are more interested in watching" media football than RPL. Shamil Gadzhiev from Life emphasized that interest to football bloggers is "sometimes even greater than in recognized sports masters". Sergey Mikhailichenko from Football Culture wrote that today media football is "a fairly serious topic with good investments and a large audience coverage".

Vasily Utkin believes that media football should not be singled out as a separate phenomenon. Anzor Kavazashvili has a positive attitude towards media football. Some other former and current professional football players, such as Oleg Kornaukhov, Sergei Bozhin and Denis Yakuba, on the contrary, are skeptical about media football.

Konstantin Krinsky from Championat.com writes that media football is "a great promoter of the Russian Cup at the lower stages". Minister of Sports Oleg Matytsin spoke positively about the participation of media teams in the Russian Cup.

Mikhail Kerzhakov believes that media football will not be more popular than professional football. Kirill Malyarov wonders why some footballers prefer media football over professional football. Igor Osinkin called media football "quite interesting", but does not believe that it will replace professional football in the near future.

See also 
 Hashtag United F.C.

References

External links 
 
 
 
 
 

Association football variants